The CEV Women's Challenge Cup, formerly (from 1980 to 2007) known as CEV Women's Cup is the third official competition for women's volleyball clubs of Europe and takes place every year. In 2007 it was renamed  following a CEV decision to rename its second official competition (known as Top Teams Cup) to CEV Cup.

Results summary

CEV Cup

CEV Challenge Cup

Note: The third place match was abolished in 2010. The table's column "Third place" display the losing semifinalists from the 2010–11 season onwards.

Titles by club

Titles by country
Notes: 
1. For the purpose of keeping historical event accuracy, historical countries names are used in this table.  
2. The column "Third place" includes results until 2010 as the third place match was abolished since then.

MVP by edition 
2000–01 – 
2001–02 – 
2002–03 – 
2003–04 – 
2004–05 – 
2005–06 – 
2006–07 – 
2007–08 – 
2008–09 – 
2009–10 – 
2010–11 – 
2011–12 – 
2012–13 – 
2013–14 – 
2014–15 – 
2015–16 – 
2016–17 – 
2017–18 – 
2018–19 – 
2019–20 – event cancelled due to pandemic
2020–21 – 
2021–22 –

All-time team records 
Winners and finalists by city since 1980/1981

Various statistics since 2006/2007

(Based on W=2 pts and D=1 pts)

References
 European Cups
 CEV 40th Anniversary Book - European Cups

Citations

External links
 CEV Website

 
W
European volleyball records and statistics
Recurring sporting events established in 1980
1980 establishments in Europe
National cup competitions
Multi-national professional sports leagues